Schwartzkopff may refer to:

Schwartzkopff-Eckhardt II bogie, a mechanical device
L. Schwartzkopff, a German locomotive manufacturer, later Berliner Maschinenbau AG
Schwartzkopff torpedo, a series of torpedoes in use at least 1873-1900, made by Berliner Maschinenbau AG

People with the surname
Louis Victor Robert Schwartzkopff (1825–1892), German businessman

See also
Schwarzkopf (disambiguation)